Merawi (Amharic: መርዓዊ) is a city administration located 30 kilometers south of Bahir Dar, Amhara Region's capital in north-western Ethiopia, in what was previously Bahir Dar Awraja of Gojjam province. The town also hosts the seat of Mecha Woreda administration.

Geography 

Merawi is situated about 30 kilometers south of Bahir Dar and approximately c.525 km from Addis Ababa, Ethiopia's capital.

History 

Merawi in its modern form is said to be founded in early 1940s by Dejazmach Abere Yimam, then governor of Gojjam and his younger brother Fitawrari Admasu Yimam. Fitawrari Admasu was the first administrator of Merawi. The Yimam brothers, together with other iconic patriots such as Belay Zeleke, defended Gojjam from Italians and were recognized as national heroes. The town is also known to be the birthplace of prominent politicians and national heroes such as Colonel Tadesse Muluneh, a former airforce pilot for Ethiopian National Defence Forces renowned for his bravery during the Ogaden War, later turned politician as the Co-founder and first chairman of Ethiopian Patriotic Front; Wassie Gela, one of the first Ethiopian soldiers (together with Kerie Degu) who broke the Eritrean mighty "Geza Gebresilassie" mine fortress during the Ethio-Eritrean War of 1998–2000; Dessalegn Chanie (PhD), first chairman of National Movement for Amhara (NaMA), Zemene Kassie of Amhara Youth Association; Fasil Yene'alem of ESAT; Tazebew Assefa of Amhara Democratic Force Movement; Captain Memar Getnet of Amhara Special Forces, Gashu Kindu (MD), First President & Co-Founder of Amhara Medical Association, Tesfahun Alemneh (studied in Merawi) of Amhara Democratic Force Movement, etc.

Demographics 

Like any other parts of the country, Merawi has shown a steady increase in its population in the last decade. Based on latest projections from the Central Statistical Agency of Ethiopia (CSA)., Merawi is estimated to have a total population of 35,541, of whom 18,479 are male and 17,062 are female.

The 2005 Census, conducted by CSA., documented that the town had a total population of 22,676, of whom 11,432 are men and 11,244 women. The town is also a seat of one of the most populous Woreda in Amhara region, Mecha Woreda,  having a total population of 292,250 in 2005 Census (and estimated to 340,289 in 2015.). Majority of the inhabitants (98.91%) practiced Ethiopian Orthodox Christianity.

The 1994 national census reported a total population of 12,278. The largest ethnic group reported in Merawi was the Amhara (99.91%). Amharic was spoken as a first language by 99.96%. The majority of the inhabitants practiced Ethiopian Orthodox Christianity, with 98.84% reporting that as their religion, while 1.09% were Muslim.

Economy 

Having been dormant for almost half a century, the town has shown some progress in the last few years. Nonetheless, its economy is still predominantly led by small-scale merchandise trade, services, agriculture, and small-scale cottage industries. In particular, the livelihood of a sizable number of its residents still rely on production and marketing of traditional alcoholic drinks called "Tella" and "Arekie". In fact, the traditional "Arekie" of Merawi is a popular brand alcohol being widely traded in north-western parts of Ethiopia such as Bahir Dar, Gondar, Humera, and Metema, and is said to be smuggled into the Sudan. Besides, the town is known for its huge timber market; largely eucalyptus tree, indicating its immense potential to host a pulp and paper industry.

The town hosts the headquarters of Koga Integrated Irrigation Dam project which currently serves more than 10,000 smallholder farm households. As the hub of Koga Integrated Irrigation Dam project, the town and its neighboring villages are expected to benefit from marketing surplus production. According to the regional government's strategic plan, the area is expected to be one of the prime food baskets in the region. Aquaculture production and marketing has surged at the artificial Koga Dam. It is expected to host tourists for excursion in near future. The economic activities are facilitated by the banking services provided by the branches of Commercial Bank of Ethiopia and Buna International Bank.

Education and Health 

The town has one of the oldest elementary schools in the region, Merawi elementary school, which was founded in 1948. It also has an additional public elementary school, two comprehensive high schools and one public Technic and Vocational College. A recently established Koga health science college is stationed in the town. The town's proximity to Bahir Dar has helped secure some of the finest teachers in the region, which is evident in the successful achievement of its students in higher studies in the region. Bahir Dar University's extension programs are quite popular in the town.

The town has a few number of private and public health clinics, one public health center and one public hospital.

Transportation 

The town enjoys Minibuses almost every next half hour to Bahir Dar. For a safe travel from Addis Ababa to Merawi, one could take Ethiopian Airlines which operates thrice daily flights to Bahir Dar and take 30 minutes drive to Merawi. Besides, the town has almost hourly bus travel services to nearby rural towns of Mecha Woreda such as Wetet Abay and Birakat. Although yet a poor quality, the road to Birakat extends to Adet. Cycling is the most common and convenient way of traveling within the town. Lately, Tricycle has also become a popular means of transportation.

Notes 

Populated places in the Amhara Region